The following lists events that happened during 2010 in the Nagorno-Karabakh Republic.

Incumbents
 President: Bako Sahakyan
 Prime Minister: Arayik Harutyunyan
 Speaker: Ashot Ghulian

Events

May
 May 23 - Voters in the Nagorno-Karabakh Republic vote in a parliamentary election as more than 70 international observers watch.

References

 
2010s in the Republic of Artsakh
Nagorno-Karabakh Republic
Years of the 21st century in the Nagorno-Karabakh Republic
Nagorno-Karabakh Republic
Nagorno-Karabakh Republic